In 2019, Pennsylvania had a total summer capacity of 47,812 MW through all of its power plants, and a net generation of 228,995 GWh.  The corresponding electrical energy generation mix was 42.9% natural gas, 36.3% nuclear, 16.5% coal, 1.5% hydroelectric, 1.4% wind, 0.9% biomass, 0.4% non-biogenic waste, and 0.1% petroleum.  Small-scale solar, which includes customer-owned photovoltaic panels, delivered an additional net 492 GWh of energy to the state's electrical grid.  This was more than five times greater than the 83 GWh (0.04%) of generation by Pennsylvania's utility-scale photovoltaic plants.

The generating mix in Pennsylvania has been shifting from coal to gas, as in other U.S. states.  Extraction of the state's fossil-fuel resources for domestic and foreign export sale ranked among the highest in the nation during 2019.

Nuclear power stations

Source: U.S. Energy Information Administration (MW Totals as of August 2014)

Fossil-fuel power stations
Data from the U.S. Energy Information Administration serves as a general reference.

Coal

Natural gas

 The Clairton, Erie, and Mon Valley facilities burn other hydrocarbon gases released during processing of coal to produce coke.

Petroleum

Renewable power stations
Data from the U.S. Energy Information Administration serves as a general reference.

Biomass and Municipal Waste

Hydroelectric

Solar

Wind

Storage power stations
Data from the U.S. Energy Information Administration serves as a general reference.

Battery

Flywheel

Pumped Storage

Former power stations

See also
List of power stations in the United States

References

 
Pennsylvania
Geographic coordinate lists
Lists of buildings and structures in Pennsylvania
Energy infrastructure in Pennsylvania